The 2015 Giro d'Italia Femminile, or 2015 Giro Rosa, was the 26th running of the Giro d'Italia Femminile, the only remaining women's Grand Tour and the most prestigious stage race on the 2015 women's road cycling calendar.

The 2015 running of the race contained the customary high mountain stages as well as a time trial during the final week. On July 11, the riders tackled the 21.7 km individual time trial starting in the region of Vergante, Piedmont. The route was described as containing technical and rolling terrain, concluding in a 4 km climb to Comnago.

Stages

Prologue
3 July 2015 – Ljubljana – Ljubljana,

Stage 1
4 July 2015 – Kamnik – Ljubljana,

Stage 2
5 July 2015 – Gaiarine – San Fior,

Stage 3
6 July 2015 – Curtatone – Mantua,

Stage 4
7 July 2015 – Pioltello – Pozzo d'Adda,

Stage 5
8 July 2015 – Trezzo sull'Adda – Aprica, 
Stage 5 marks the first summit finish of the race, with the 15 kilometre climb up to the ski resort at Aprica. The average gradient of the climb is 3% with some sections over 10%.

Stage 6
9 July 2015 – Tresivio – Morbegno,

Stage 7
10 July 2015 – Arenzano – Loano, 
The seventh and Queen stage of the race took the riders up through the climbs of Naso di Gatto and Melogno.

Stage 8 (ITT)
11 July 2015 – Pisano – Nebbiuno,

Stage 9
12 July 2015 – Verbania – San Domenico di Varzo,

Classification leadership

See also
 2015 in women's road cycling

References

External links
Official site

2015 in women's road cycling
Giro d'Italia Femminile